Iazu is an impact crater located within the Meridiani Planum extraterrestrial plain, situated within the Margaritifer Sinus quadrangle (MC-19) region of the planet Mars. This geological feature is about 7 km in diameter. It is close to the landing site of the Mars Exploration Rover-B Opportunity, and its walls have been photographed by the spacecraft during its traverse to Endeavour Crater. It was named in 2006 for Iazu, a village in Dâmbovița County, southern Romania.

Bopolu (crater) is west of Iazu and Endeavour crater.

Views from orbit

From surface

Context map

See also
List of craters on Mars
Geography of Mars

References

External links
Official Mars Exploration Rovers website
Iazu crater - HiRISE

Impact craters on Mars
Margaritifer Sinus quadrangle